Sir Andrew Piers Wingate Akin-Sneath Rodgers, 3rd Baronet (born 24 October 1944), was secretary of the Royal Academy of Arts from 1982 to 1996.

He was born on 24 October 1944 in Oxford, the son of the Conservative Party politician Sir John Rodgers, 1st Baronet (1906–1993), and his wife, Betsy Aikin-Sneath. He was educated at Eton and Merton College, Oxford.

In 1996, he was succeeded by David Gordon, the former chief executive of Independent Television News (ITN) and the Economist Group, as secretary of the Royal Academy. He is respected within the art world for his conservation work with UNESCO, and his positive influence during twelve years of employment at the Royal Academy.

He is currently married to Ilona, Lady Rodgers, and has four children: Thomas Rodgers (heir to the baronetcy) and Augustus Rodgers both with his former wife; and Hermione Rodgers and Anna-Laetitia Rodgers with Ilona.

Arms

References

1944 births
Alumni of Merton College, Oxford
People educated at Eton College
Baronets in the Baronetage of the United Kingdom
British art historians
British curators
Living people